The Central Connecticut Blue Devils men's basketball team is the men's basketball team that represent Central Connecticut State University in New Britain, Connecticut, United States. The school's team currently competes in the Northeast Conference and are coached by Patrick Sellers. The team last played in the NCAA Division I men's basketball tournament in 2007.

History

Central's first year of competition was the 1934-35 season under coach Harrison J. Kaiser, after whom the athletic building is named. CCSU joined the NCAA Division I ranks in the 1986-87 season, marking 2020-21 as the 35th season at the Division I level.

Classification

Home court

Conference affiliation

Year by year results
{| class="wikitable"

|- align="center"

|-style="background: #ffffdd;"
| colspan="8" align="center" | Northeast Conference

Postseason

NCAA Division I Tournament results
The Blue Devils have appeared in three NCAA Division I Tournaments. Their combined record is 0–3.

NCAA Division II Tournament results
The Blue Devils have appeared in six NCAA Division II Tournaments. Their combined record is 6–8.

NAIA National Tournament results

The Blue Devils have appeared in 10 NAIB/NAIA National Tournaments at Municipal Auditorium in Kansas City, Missouri. Their combined record is 1–10.

NCAA Division I Conference awards

Player of the Year
Northeast Conference

 2011 – Ken Horton
 2007 – Javier Mojica
 2004 – Ron Robinson
 2002 – Corsley Edwards
 2000 – Rick Mickens

Defensive Player of the Year
Northeast Conference

 2008 – Tristan Blackwood
 2007 – Tristan Blackwood
 2000 – Rick Mickens

East Coast Conference

 1991 – Patrick Sellers

Rookie of the Year
Northeast Conference

 2012 – Kyle Vinales
 2008 – Shemik Thompson

East Coast Conference

 1991 – Bryon Smith

All-Conference First Team
Northeast Conference

 2013 - Kyle Vinales
 2012 – Ken Horton
 2011 – Ken Horton
 2008 – Tristan Blackwood
 2007 – Tristan Blackwood, Javier Mojica, Obie Nwadike
 2006 – Justin Chiera
 2004 – Ron Robinson
 2003 – Ron Robinson
 2002 – Corsley Edwards
 2001 – Corsley Edwards
 2000 – Rick Mickens

Mid-Continent Conference

 1996 – Keith Closs

All-Conference Second Team
Northeast Conference

 2015 – Matt Mobley
 2009 – Ken Horton
 2002 – Damian Battles, Ricardo Scott
 2001 – John Tice
 2000 – Corsley Edwards, John Tice
 1999 – Rick Mickens, Charron Watson
 1998 – Rick Mickens

Mid-Continent Conference

 1997 – Sean Scott

All-Rookie Team
Northeast Conference

 2020 – Myles Baker
 2019 – Ian Krishnan
 2016 - Austin Nehls
 2014 - Matt Mobley
 2013 - Brandon Peel
 2012 – Kyle Vinales
 2008 – Ken Horton, Shemik Thompson
 2004 – Obie Nwadike
 2003 – Justin Chiera
 2001 – Ron Robinson
 1999 – Corsley Edwards
 1998 – Marijus Kovaliukas

Mid-Continent Conference

 1995 – Keith Closs, Bill Langheim

Coach of the Year
Northeast Conference

 Howie Dickenman – 2007, 2006, 2002, 2000

Other awards

All-American Selections
First Team
 Howie Dickenman – 1969

Second Team
 Richard Leonard – 1984 & 1983
 Steve Ayers – 1982 
 Bill Reaves – 1971 & 1970

Third Team
 Steve Ayers – 1981

Honorable Mention
 Ken Horton – 2011

UPI Selection
 Eugene Reily – 1966

All-New England selections
First Team
 Rich Leonard – 1984 
 Steve Ayers – 1982 
 Bill Reaves – 1971
 Howie Dickenman – 1969

Second Team
 Corsley Edwards – 2002
 Rick Mickens – 2000
 Byran Heron – 1989
 Ken Hightower – 1984
 Rich Leonard & Steve Ayers – 1983
 Billy Wendt – 1973
 Howie Dickenman – 1968 
 Paul Zajac – 1967

Third Team
 Greg Roberts – 1978
 Jere Quinn & Robert Charbonneau – 1977

Blue Devils in the NBA
Corsley Edwards – 2002 NBA Draft – Round 2, Pick 29 / Sacramento Kings (10 games played)
Keith Closs – 1997 Free Agent / Los Angeles Clippers (130 games played)
Howie Dickenman – 1969 NBA Draft – Round 17, Pick 210 / Phoenix Suns (did not play)

References

External links